National Route 498 is a national highway of Japan connecting between Kashima, Saga and Sasebo, Nagasaki in Japan, with total length has 56.6 km (35.2 mi).

References

498